Milesia cretosa is a species of hoverfly in the family Syrphidae.

Distribution
Myanmar, India.

References

Insects described in 1990
Eristalinae
Diptera of Asia